Curicta may refer to:
 Curicta (bug), a genus of bugs in the family Nepidae (water scorpions)
 the Latin name for the island of Krk, Croatia